Nyayo Car was a project by the Kenyan government to plan and manufacture Kenyan cars. The project was initiated in 1986 when then president Daniel arap Moi asked the University of Nairobi to develop the vehicles.

Five prototypes were made, named Pioneer Nyayo Cars and they attained a speed of 120 km/h. The Nyayo Motor Corporation was established to mass-produce these cars. However, due to lack of funds, the car never entered into production.

The Nyayo Motor Corporation was later renamed Numerical Machining Complex Limited, manufacturing metal parts for various local industries. The car became a synonym for the many white elephants that signified the government of the day.

References

External links 
 African Cars : The Nyayo Pioneer
 Govt To Revive Nyayo Car Project - Mars Group Kenya
 Numerical Machining Complex Ltd

Cars of Kenya
Cars introduced in 1986
Car manufacturers of Kenya